Salling is a peninsula in Denmark. Salling may also refer to
Salling Clicker, a suite of computer programs to enable the remote control of a computer from a mobile phone
Salling (department store) in Denmark
Salling (surname)